Johann Friedrich Wilhelm Ferdinand Collmann (born October 1762 in Berlin; died 28 August 1837) was a German painter and professor, and between 1821 and 1837 he was a member of the Preußische Akademie der Künste.

Among his works were portraits of Christoph Friedrich Nicolai, Johann Jakob Engel (1789), Ewald Friedrich von Hertzberg (1789), Daniel Nikolaus Chodowiecki (1790), Johann Erich Biester (1795) and Johann Georg Krünitz (1795).

See also
 List of German painters

References

External links

18th-century German painters
18th-century German male artists
German male painters
19th-century German painters
19th-century German male artists
1762 births
1837 deaths